This is a list of places on the Victorian Heritage Register in the Shire of Murrindindi in Victoria, Australia. The Victorian Heritage Register is maintained by the Heritage Council of Victoria.

The Victorian Heritage Register, as of 2021, lists the following seven state-registered places within the Shire of Murrindindi:

References 

Murrindindi
+
+